Shizishan Station is a station of Line 1 and Line 3 of Suzhou Rail Transit. The station is located in Suzhou New District of Suzhou. The station was formerly named Suzhou Amusement Land Station but was renamed due to the closure of the amusement park. It has been in use since April 28, 2012, the same time of the operation of Line 1. The platforms for Line 3 were opened in December.

Station

Accessible Information
 Shizishan station is a fully accessible station, this station equipped with wheelchair accessible elevators, blind paths with bumps, and wheelchair ramps. These facilities can help people with disabilities, seniors, youths, and pregnancies travel through Suzhou Rail Transit system.

Station configurations
L1 (First Floor/Street Level): Entrances/Exits (stairs and escalators); and elevators with wheelchair accessible ramps.

B1 (Mezzanine/Station Hall Level): Station Control Room; Customer Service; Automatic Ticket Vending Machines; Automatic Fee Collection Systems with turnstiles; stairs and escalators; and elevators with wheelchair accessible ramps.

B2 (Platform Level): Line 1 platforms; toilet; stairs and escalators; elevators with wheelchair accessible ramps.

B3 (Platform Level): Line 3 platforms; toilet; stairs and escalators; elevators with wheelchair accessible ramps.

Station layout

Timetable

Station exit list
Exit 1: West side of Changjiang Lu and Shishan Lu, inside of Suzhou Amusement Land

Exit 2: Southwest side of Changjiang Lu and Shishan Lu

Exit 3a: Southwest corner of Changjiang Lu and Shishan Lu, on the side of Changjiang Lu

Exit 3b: Southeast corner of Changjiang Lu and Shishan Lu, inside of Suoshan Park

Exit 4a: Northwest corner of Changjiang Lu and Shishan Lu, on the side of Changjiang Lu

Exit 4b: Northeast corner of Changjiang Lu and Shishan Lu, on the side of Shishan Lu

Exit 5: Southeast corner of Changjiang Lu and Jinshan Lu

Exit 6: Northwest corner of Changjiang Lu and Jinshan Lu, on the side of Jinshan Lu

Exit 7: Southwest corner of Changjiang Lu and Jinshan Lu, on the side of Jinshan Lu

Exit 8: West side of Changjiang Lu

Local places
 Shishan Plaza
 Lvbao Plaza
 Suzhou West Coach Bus Station
 Yuhuayuan
 Suoshan Park

Transport connections
Shizishan - Connection Bus Routes: Tour 3, 2, 33, 37, 38, 51, 89, 303, 304, 312, 333, BRT 11

Keyun Xizhan (West Coach Station) - Connection Bus Routes: 42, 51, 67, 302, 303, 304, 322, 324, 327, 329, 333, 357, 816, 937, 3005, Peak 18

Shizishan - route 1

References

Railway stations in Jiangsu
Suzhou Rail Transit stations
Railway stations in China opened in 2012